The Golden Rod Grange No. 114 is a historic Grange hall on New Hampshire Route 32 in Swanzey, New Hampshire, United States.  Built in 1916, it continues to occupy a significant place in the community as a meeting and function space.  The little-altered building was listed on the National Register of Historic Places in 1994.  It is now owned by the town and maintained by the Swanzey Preservation Society.

Description and history
The Golden Rod Grange stands in the village center of Swanzey, on the west side of New Hampshire Route 32, opposite the church and town hall. It is a two-story rectangular wooden structure, with a gabled roof and clapboarded exterior. That facade has five symmetrically placed windows on the second floor, and an irregular arrangement of windows on the ground floor, with the main entrance at the center and a secondary entrance at the right end. The interior is divided into a meeting and dining hall with kitchen on the ground floor, and auditorium with antechamber on the upper level. In the auditorium, the roof's Warren trusses are exposed. Most of the original wall finishes are plaster and pine, although these have been covered in some areas.

The building was constructed in 1915-16 to serve the local Grange chapter, its layout typifying functions commonly supported by New England Grange chapters.  The building's modifications have generally been limited to cosmetic alterations, including the covering over of original finishes, and the addition of a steel fire escape on the north end of the building.  The stage curtain in the auditorium is painted to depict a local pond. The building is now maintained by the Swanzey Preservation Society.

See also
National Register of Historic Places listings in Cheshire County, New Hampshire

References

External links
Swanzey Preservation Society page

Clubhouses on the National Register of Historic Places in New Hampshire
Grange organizations and buildings in New Hampshire
Buildings and structures in Cheshire County, New Hampshire
National Register of Historic Places in Cheshire County, New Hampshire
Agricultural buildings and structures on the National Register of Historic Places in New Hampshire
Grange buildings on the National Register of Historic Places